The discography of Everything but the Girl consists of eleven studio albums, eight compilation albums, five extended plays, thirty-one singles, and one video album.

The band formed in Hull during 1982, consisting of lead singer and occasional guitarist Tracey Thorn and guitarist, keyboardist, and singer Ben Watt.

Albums

Studio albums

Compilation albums

Home video

Extended plays

Singles

Music videos

References

External links
 Official website

Discographies of British artists
Pop music group discographies
Rock music group discographies
Electronic music discographies